Dakik Family also known as "House of Hazrat Ishaan" is an Afghan aristocratic family from the Telai branch of the Afghan Royal Family based in North Rhine-Westfalia, Germany. They are of Muslim faith, inheriting the Cultural Heritage of Sayyid Mir Jan.

Escape from Afghanistan 
After the Saur Revolution the family received an amnesty by President Hafizullah Amin, because Prince Abdul Khaliq was his former Professor in the faculty of Science at Kabul University. This amnesty ended with President Barbrak Karmal fearing an uprising of Prince Abdul Khaliq and his wife, which led to Prince Abdul Khaliq being imprisoned and Princess Rahima fleeing with her son Sultan Masood to Pakistan 7 days by feet. In Pakistan they have been evacuated to West Germany. Since then they live in Exile and actively work on philanthropic projects and development activities worldwide.

Meaning of the surname Dakik 
On the occasion of the escape from Afghanistan the surname "Dakik" was chosen, which means "exact" or "subtle" in honor of Sayyid Mir Jan and in pride of their descent from Prophet Muhammad through the Sayyid ul Sadaat Clan (Arabic for "Sayyids of the Sayyids"). The Clan is proud of their subtle -thus Dakik- hereditary line of succession from Prophet Muhammad to their patron saint Sayyid Mir Jan as the most sublime Sayyid of all Sayyids ("Sayyid ul Sadaat"), which is the cornerstone of the Cultural Heritage of Sayyid Mir Jan.

Prominent members 
 HRH Princess Sayyida Rahima Dakik (d. 2006) Daughter of the head of the Cultural Heritage of Sayyid Mir Jan His Serene Highness Prince Sayyid Mir Muhammad Jan leading the Sayyid ul Sadaat Clan. She married HRH Prince Abdul Khaliq Khan from the Muhammadzai Dynasty, who was HSH Prince Sayyid Mir Muhammad Jan´s religious devotee. Leader of the Sayyid ul Sadaat Clan by the will of her father, as an Afghan Royal by marriage. 
 
 HRH Sayyid Sultan Masood Dakik (b. 1967) Son of Princess Sayyida Rahima Dakik and Prince Abdul Khaliq, Political Advisor, State Development Expert, First Afghan to be awarded with the Order of Merit of the Federal Republic of Germany, Founder of the Dakik Style Calligraphy, European Champion in Judo, Married his cousin Sayyida Nargis Dakik, niece of Princess Sayyida Rahima Dakik.

Hereditary titles 
 Prince (Sardar), as members of the Afghan Royal Family
 Sayyid ul Sadaat, as members of the Sayyid ul Sadaat Clan

See also 
 Abdul Qadir Gilani
 Bahauddin Naqshband
 Hazrat Ishaan
 Sayyid Mir Jan
 Sayyid Hassan bin Azimullah
 the Sayyid ul Sadaat Clan
 Sayyid
 Sardar
 Saur Revolution
 Mughal Imperial Dynasty
 Muhammadzai Dynasty
 Hotaki Imperial Dynasty

References 

Family of Muhammad
Alids
Princes
Barakzai dynasty
Afghan culture
Pashtun culture
Hashemite people
Sufi religious leaders
Naqshbandi order
People of Arab descent
People from Kabul
Kingdom of Afghanistan